The Washington Award is an American engineering award.

Since 1916 it has been given annually for "accomplishments which promote the happiness, comfort, and well-being of humanity". It is awarded jointly by the following engineering societies: American Institute of Mining, Metallurgical, and Petroleum Engineers, American Nuclear Society, American Society of Civil Engineers, American Society of Mechanical Engineers, Institute of Electrical and Electronics Engineers, National Society of Professional Engineers, and Western Society of Engineers (which administers the award).

Honorees 
Source: The Washington Award
 Herbert C. Hoover, 1919 
 Robert W. Hunt, 1922
 Arthur N. Talbot, 1924 
 Jonas Waldo Smith, 1925 
 John Watson Alvord, 1926 
 Orville Wright, 1927 
 Michael Idvorsky Pupin, 1928 
 Bion Joseph Arnold, 1929 
 Mortimer Elwyn Cooley, 1930 
 Ralph Modjeski, 1931
 William David Coolidge, 1932 
 Ambrose Swasey, 1935 
 Charles Franklin Kettering, 1936 
 Frederick Gardner Cottrell, 1937
 Frank Baldwin Jewett, 1938 
 Daniel Webster Mead, 1939 
 Daniel Cowan Jackling, 1940 
 Ralph Budd, 1941 
 William Lamont Abbott, 1942 
 Andrey Abraham Potter, 1943 
 Henry Ford, 1944 
 Arthur Holly Compton, 1945 
 Vannevar Bush, 1946 
 Karl Taylor Compton, 1947 
 Ralph Edward Flanders, 1948 
 John Lucian Savage, 1949
 Wilfred Sykes, 1950 
 Edwin Howard Armstrong, 1951 
 Henry Townley Heald, 1952
 Gustav Egloff, 1953
 Lillian Moller Gilbreth, 1954 
 Charles Erwin Wilson, 1955 
 Robert E. Wilson, 1956 
 Walker Lee Cisler, 1957 
 Ben Moreell, 1958 
 James R. Killian, Jr., 1959 
 Herbert Payne Sedwick, 1960 
 William V. Kahler, 1961 
 Alexander C. Monteith, 1962 
 Philip Sporn, 1963 
 John Slezak, 1964 
 Glenn Theodore Seaborg, 1965 
 Augustus Braun Kinzel, 1966 
 Frederick Lawson Hovde, 1967 
 James B. Fisk, 1968 
 Nathan M. Newmark, 1969 
 H.G. Rickover, 1970 
 William L. Everitt, 1971 
 Thomas Otten Paine, 1972 
 John A. Volpe, 1973 
 John D. deButts, 1974 
 David Packard, 1975 
 Ralph B. Peck, 1976 
 Michael Tenenbaum, 1977 
 Dixy Lee Ray, 1978 
 Marvin Camras, 1979 
 Neil Armstrong, 1980 
 John E. Swearingen, 1981 
 Manson Benedict, 1982 
 John Bardeen, 1983 
 Robert W. Galvin, 1984 
 Stephen D. Bechtel, 1985 
 Mark Shepherd Jr., 1986 
 Grace Murray Hopper, 1987 
 James McDonald, 1988 
 Sherwood L. Fawcett, 1989 
 John H. Sununu, 1990 
 Frank Borman, 1991 
 Leon M. Lederman, 1992 
 William States Lee, 1993 
 Kenneth H. Olson, 1994 
 George W. Housner, 1995 
 Wilson Greatbatch, 1996 
 Frank Kreith, 1997 
 John R. Conrad, 1998 
 Jack S. Kilby, 1999 
 Donna Lee Shirley, 2000 
 Dan Bricklin, 2001 
 Bob Frankston, 2001
 Richard J. Robbins, 2002
 Eugene Cernan, 2003
 Nick Holonyak, 2004
 Robert S. Langer, 2005 
 Henry Petroski, 2006 
 Michael J. Birck, 2007
 Dean Kamen, 2008
 Clyde N. Baker, Jr., 2009
 Alvy Ray Smith, 2010
 Martin C. Jischke, 2011 
 Martin Cooper, 2012
 Kristina M. Johnson, 2013
 Bill Nye, 2014
 Bernard Amadei, 2015 
 Aprille Joy Ericsson, 2016
 Chuck Hull, 2017
 Ivan Sutherland, 2018
 Margaret Hamilton, 2019
 Richard A. Berger, 2020
 John B. Goodenough, 2021
 John Rogers, 2022

See also

 List of engineering awards

References

External links 
 

Engineering awards
Awards established in 1916
American science and technology awards